Darreh Tefi or Darreh-ye Tefi or Darreh Tafi or Darreh Tofi or Darreh-ye Tafi may refer to:
 Darreh Tefi, Marivan
 Darreh-ye Tafi, Saqqez